Florentina Curpene (born 26 August 1967) is a Romanian-born German former professional tennis player.

Curpene is originally from the Romanian city of Pitești but has lived in Germany since 1989. Before relocating she played Federation Cup tennis, featuring in two ties for Romania in 1986. She reached a best singles ranking on the professional tour of 209 in the world. In 2022 she won a senior world team championship for Germany in the 50s age group.

ITF finals

Singles: 2 (1–1)

Doubles: 1 (0–1)

References

External links
 
 
 

1967 births
Living people
Romanian female tennis players
Sportspeople from Pitești
Romanian emigrants to Germany